The reclusive ringtail possum or Monk ringtail possum (Pseudochirops coronatus) is a species of marsupial in the family Pseudocheiridae. It is endemic to the Arfak Mountains in the Vogelkop Peninsula of West Papua, Indonesia.

References

Possums
Mammals of Western New Guinea
Mammals described in 1897
Taxa named by Oldfield Thomas
Taxonomy articles created by Polbot
Marsupials of New Guinea